Shanmugarajan is an Indian actor who appears in Tamil films.

He is an alumnus of The American College in Madurai and National School of Drama.

Filmography

Television

References

External links 
 

Living people
Male actors in Tamil cinema
National School of Drama alumni
Male actors from Madurai
21st-century Indian male actors
Indian male film actors
Year of birth missing (living people)